The following units and commanders of the Brazilian and Paraguayan armies fought in the Battle of Ytororó on December 6, 1866.

Brazilian Imperial Army

Marshal of the Army Luís Alves de Lima e Silva, Duke of Caxias

I Corps
General Jacinto Machado Bittencourt

II Corps

General Alexandre Gomes de Argolo Ferrão Filho

III Corps

General Manuel Luís Osório

Paraguayan Army

Sources

 Warner, William. "Paraguayan Thermopylae: The Battle of Itororo", in Strategy & Tactics, issue 271 (November/December 2011).

Orders of battle
Paraguayan War
History of Central Department